Patrick Gruber (born 31 January 1978 in Bruneck) is an Italian luger who has competed since 1997. He won seven medals at the FIL World Luge Championships with two silvers (Men's doubles: 2011, Mixed team: 2007) and five bronzes (Men's doubles: 2015, 2016, Doubles sprint: 2016, Mixed team: 2004, 2005).

At the FIL European Luge Championships, Gruber won nine medals with two golds (Men's doubles: 2008, 2014), four silvers (Men's doubles: 2004; Mixed team: 2004, 2006, 2013), and three bronzes (Men's doubles: 2006; Mixed team: 2012, 2014).

Gruber has competed in three Winter Olympics, earning his best finish of fourth in the men's doubles event at Vancouver in 2010.

He won the overall men's doubles Luge World Cup title in 2004-5.

References

FIL-Luge profile
Hickok sports information on World champions in luge and skeleton.
List of men's doubles luge World Cup champions since 1978.

External links
 
 
 

1978 births
Living people
Italian lugers
Italian male lugers
Olympic lugers of Italy
Lugers at the 2002 Winter Olympics
Lugers at the 2006 Winter Olympics
Lugers at the 2010 Winter Olympics
Lugers at the 2014 Winter Olympics
Lugers of Gruppo Sportivo Esercito
Sportspeople from Bruneck